Fadak Satellite Channel (Arabic: قناة فدك الفضائية) is a Shia Islam channel that was founded by a group of Shia Muslims in the United Kingdom with the purpose of conveying Shia Islam to mainly the Arab and Muslim world.

Programming
The channel broadcasts various programs: ethical, doctrinal, historical, and revival. The channel also features Hawza lectures, Islamic Seminary, on al-Qawaid al-Fiqhiyyah (i.e. methodology of fiqh), Ilm al-Dirayah, Ilm al-Riwayah, Ilm al-Rijal, (studies related to the science of Hadith), as well as a variety of different series of lectures by English, Arabic, French and Persian speakers.

A regular figure appearing on the channel is Yasser Al-Habib, a Kuwaiti Shia Muslim scholar, writer and lecturer residing in the United Kingdom, who is also the spiritual advisor.

Controversy
The channel is known for its research and controversial approach of discussing historical characters and their violent influence on faiths, and especially for vehemently criticising the historical leadership of Sunni Muslim faith, which has angered many Sunni Muslim leaders across the globe. The channel also broadcasts rituals of prayer and celebrations held by the Shia Muslim community at the Al-Muhassin Mosque, London, such as the congregational prayers held during Eid days as well as death anniversaries of historical characters, like for instance Abu Bakr, Umar, Aisha, and even Arab leaders in the Middle East such as the late Saudi King, Abdullah of Saudi Arabia.

Support
The Fadak Satellite Channel is closely connected to the Khoddam al-Mahdi organization, whom Sheikh Yasser Al-Habib also serves as the spiritual father.

Availability

The Fadak Satellite Channel is currently available on Hotbird and Optus D2.
The channel is also available on Roku as a private channel (Vanity Access Code: fadak).

References

External links

Arabic-language television
Arabic-language television stations
Islamic television networks
Television channels and stations established in 2011